Noel Rogers (28 December 1923 – 27 May 1982) was an Australian cricketer. He played in three first-class matches for Queensland in 1947/48.

See also
 List of Queensland first-class cricketers

References

External links
 

1923 births
1982 deaths
Australian cricketers
Queensland cricketers
Cricketers from Brisbane